The National University of Catamarca (UNCA) is an Argentine national university, situated in the city of Catamarca, capital of Catamarca Province.

See also
 University of Catamarca Museum: Museo Integral de la Reserva de Biosfera de Laguna Blanca
Science and Education in Argentina
Argentine Higher Education Official Site 
 Argentine Universities

Catamarca
Educational institutions established in 1972
Universities in Catamarca Province